Jerseyville is an unincorporated community located within Howell Township in Monmouth County, New Jersey, United States. It is primarily a rural area within the northern part of the township, near Colts Neck and Freehold. Route 33 Business travels through Jerseyville, with some development, including a gas station, a convenience store, a church, and several residences.

Originally known as Green Grove, the area's name was changed by residents to Jerseyville in 1854.

References

Neighborhoods in Howell Township, New Jersey
Unincorporated communities in Monmouth County, New Jersey
Unincorporated communities in New Jersey